The 2009 TC 2000 Championship was the 31st Turismo Competicion 2000 season. It began on April 5 and ended on November 29 after 12 races. José María López won his second successive title for Equipo Petrobras.

Teams and drivers

Race calendar and results

Championship standings

Top 10

References

External links
Official site (Spanish)

TC 2000 Championship seasons
TC 2000 season
TC 2000 season